Baroness Young may refer to:

*Janet Young, Baroness Young (1926–2002), first woman Leader of the House of Lords and cabinet minister under Margaret Thatcher
Barbara Young, Baroness Young of Old Scone (born 1948), former Labour Whip in the Lords and head of numerous charities and agencies
Lola Young, Baroness Young of Hornsey (born 1951), actress, cultural studies professor, and crossbench peer in the Lords

See also
Lord Young (disambiguation)

Noble titles created in 1971